William Dennis Weaver (June 4, 1924 – February 24, 2006) was an American actor and former president of the Screen Actors Guild, best known for his work in television and films from the early 1950s until just before his death in 2006. Weaver's two most famous roles were as Marshal Matt Dillon's trusty partner Chester Goode/Proudfoot on the CBS western Gunsmoke and as Deputy Marshal Sam McCloud on the NBC police drama McCloud. He starred in the 1971 television film Duel, the first film of director Steven Spielberg. He is also remembered for his role as the twitchy motel attendant in Orson Welles's film Touch of Evil (1958).

Early life
Weaver was born June 4, 1924, in Joplin, Missouri, the son of Walter Leon "Doc" Weaver and his wife Lenna Leora (née Prather). His father was of English, Irish, Scottish, Cherokee, and Osage ancestry. Weaver wanted to be an actor from childhood. He lived in Shreveport, Louisiana, for several years and for a short time in Manteca, California. He studied at Joplin Junior College, then transferred to the University of Oklahoma at Norman, where he studied drama and was a track star, setting records in several events. During World War II, he served as a pilot in the United States Navy, flying Grumman F4F Wildcat fighter aircraft. After the war, he married Gerry Stowell (his childhood sweetheart), with whom he had three children. Under the name Billy D. Weaver, he tried out for the 1948 U.S. Olympic team in the decathlon, finishing sixth behind 17-year-old high school track star Bob Mathias. However, only the top three finishers were selected. Weaver later commented, "I did so poorly [in the Olympic Trials], I decided to ... stay in New York and try acting."

Career
Weaver's first role on Broadway came as an understudy to Lonny Chapman as Turk Fisher in Come Back, Little Sheba. He eventually took over the role from Chapman in the national touring company. Solidifying his choice to become an actor, Weaver enrolled in the Actors Studio, where he met Shelley Winters. In the beginning of his acting career, he supported his family by doing odd jobs, including selling vacuum cleaners, tricycles, and women's hosiery.

In 1952, Shelley Winters helped him get a contract from Universal Studios. He made his film debut that same year in the movie The Redhead from Wyoming. Over the next three years, he played in a series of movies, but still had to work odd jobs to support his family. While delivering flowers, he heard he had landed the role of Chester Goode, the limping, loyal assistant of Marshal Matt Dillon (James Arness) on the new television series Gunsmoke. It was his big break; the show went on to become the highest-rated and longest-running live action series in United States television history (1955 to 1975). He received an Emmy Award in 1959 for Best Supporting Actor (Continuing Character) in a Dramatic Series.

According to the Archive of American Television interview with Weaver, the producer had him in mind for Chester, but could not locate him, and was delighted when he showed up to audition. Never having heard the radio show, Weaver gave Chester's "inane" dialog his best "method" delivery. Disappointed in his delivery, however, the producer asked for something humorous, and Weaver nailed it. The stiff leg came about when the producer pointed out that sidekicks almost always have some failing or weakness that makes them less capable than the star. Weaver decided that a stiff leg would be just the right thing.

In 1957, Weaver appeared as Commander B.D. Clagett in a single episode of the television series The Silent Service titled "Two Davids and Goliath". Having become famous as Chester, he was next cast in an offbeat supporting role in the 1958 Orson Welles film Touch of Evil, in which he played a face-twisting, body-contorting eccentric employee of a remote motel who nervously repeated, "I'm the night man."  In 1960, he appeared in an episode of Alfred Hitchcock Presents titled "Insomnia", in which his character suffers from sleeplessness owing to the tragic death of his wife. He also co-starred in a 1961 episode of The Twilight Zone titled "Shadow Play".   In that episode, Weaver's character is trapped inside his own revolving nightmare, repeatedly being tried, sentenced, and then executed in the electric chair.  Later, from 1964 to 1965, he portrayed a friendly veterinary physician raising an adopted Chinese boy as a single father in NBC's comedy drama Kentucky Jones. He had a significant role in the 1966 western Duel at Diablo, with James Garner and Sidney Poitier. His next substantial role was as Tom Wedloe on the CBS family series Gentle Ben, with co-star Clint Howard, from 1967 to 1969.

In 1970, Weaver landed the title role in the NBC series McCloud, for which he received two Emmy Award nominations. In 1974, he was nominated for Best Lead Actor in a Limited Series (McCloud) and in 1975, for Outstanding Lead Actor in a Limited Series. The show, about a modern Western lawman who ends up in New York City, was loosely based on the Clint Eastwood film Coogan's Bluff. His frequent use of the affirming Southernism, "There you go," became a catchphrase for the show. During the series, in 1971, Weaver also appeared in Duel, a television movie directed by Steven Spielberg. Spielberg selected Weaver based on the intensity of his earlier performance in Touch of Evil.

Weaver was also a recording artist, with most of his tracks being spoken-word recordings with musical accompaniment. He released several singles and albums between 1959 and 1984, most notable of which was his eponymous Im'press Records LP in 1972, the cover of which featured a portrait of Weaver in character as McCloud; it was the first of seven albums he recorded.

From 1973 to 1975, Weaver was president of the Screen Actors Guild.

His later series during the 1980s (both of which lasted only one season) were Stone in which Weaver played a Joseph Wambaugh-esque police sergeant turned crime novelist and Buck James in which he played a Texas-based surgeon and rancher. (Buck James was loosely based on real-life Texas doctor James "Red" Duke.) He portrayed a Navy rear admiral for 22 episodes of a 1983–1984 series, Emerald Point N.A.S.

In 1977, he portrayed a husband who physically abused his wife (portrayed by Sally Struthers) in the made-for-TV movie Intimate Strangers, one of the first network features to depict domestic violence. In 1978, Weaver played the trail boss R. J. Poteet in the television miniseries Centennial, in the installment titled "The Longhorns". Weaver also appeared in many acclaimed television films, including Amber Waves (1980) with Kurt Russell. Also in 1980, he portrayed Dr. Samuel Mudd, who was imprisoned for involvement in the Lincoln assassination, in The Ordeal of Dr. Mudd and starred with his real-life son Robby Weaver in the short-lived NBC police series Stone. In 1983, he played a real estate agent addicted to cocaine in Cocaine: One Man's Seduction. Weaver received probably the best reviews of his career when he starred in the 1987 film Bluffing It, in which he played a man who is illiterate. In February 2002, he appeared on the animated series The Simpsons (episode DABF07, "The Lastest Gun in the West") as the voice of aging Hollywood cowboy legend Buck McCoy.

For his contribution to the television industry, Dennis Weaver was given a star on the Hollywood Walk of Fame at 6822 Hollywood Blvd, and on the Dodge City (KS) Trail of Fame. In 1981, he was inducted into the Hall of Great Western Performers with the Bronze Wrangler Award at the National Cowboy & Western Heritage Museum in Oklahoma City, Oklahoma.

In the 1980s and 1990s, Weaver as McCloud was used to promote a rock show in New York City. He also hosted segments for the Encore Westerns premium cable network in the late 1990s and 2000s.

Weaver's last work was done on an ABC Family cable television show called Wildfire, where he played Henry Ritter, the father of Jean Ritter and the co-owner of Raintree Ranch. His role on the show was cut short by his death.

Personal life

Weaver married Gerry Stowell after World War II, and they had three sons: Richard, Robert, and Rustin Weaver. Dennis Weaver was a vegetarian from 1958 and student of yoga and meditation from the 1960s and a devoted follower of Paramahansa Yogananda, the Indian guru who established the Self-Realization Fellowship in the United States. Gerry died April 26, 2016, at 90.

Weaver's home in Ridgway, Colorado, exemplified his commitment to preserving the environment. In the late 1980s, he commissioned architect Michael Reynolds to design and build his new residence, which incorporated into its construction various recycled materials, such as old automobile tires and discarded cans, and featured passive solar power and other ecotechnologies. Weaver called his home Earthship, the same name given to the design concept pioneered by Reynolds and advanced by him as part of what was then a growing interest in "sustainable architecture" by environmentalists. Weaver and his family lived at Earthship for over 14 years, until 2004.

In July 2003, Weaver lost a daughter-in-law, Lynne Ann Weaver, wife of son Robby Weaver, in Santa Monica, California, when a car driven at high speed plowed through shoppers at the Santa Monica Farmers Market. She was one of 10 people killed in the incident.

Weaver was a lifelong active Democrat.

Activism
Weaver was an environmentalist, who promoted the use of alternative fuels, such as hydrogen and wind power, through the Institute of Ecolonomics, a nonprofit environmental organization he established in 1993 in Berthoud, Colorado.  "Ecolonomics" is a term formed by combining the words ecology and economics.  He was also involved with John Denver's WindStar Foundation, and he founded an organization called L.I.F.E. (Love is Feeding Everyone), which provided food for 150,000 needy people a week in Los Angeles.

Weaver was also active in liberal political causes. He used his celebrity status as a fundraiser and organizer for George McGovern's campaign for President in 1972.

In 2004, he led a fleet of alternative-fuel vehicles across the United States  to raise awareness about America's dependence on oil.

Weaver was consistently involved with the annual Genesis Awards, which honor those in the news and entertainment media who bring attention to the plight and suffering of animals.  Established by the Ark Trust, the award has been presented by the Humane Society of the United States since 2002.

Death
Weaver died of complications from prostate cancer at his home in Ridgway, Colorado, on February 24, 2006.

Filmography

1952: Horizons West – Dandy Taylor
1952: The Raiders – Dick Logan (uncredited)
1953: The Redhead from Wyoming – Matt Jessup
1953: The Lawless Breed – Jim Clements
1953: The Mississippi Gambler – Julian Conant (uncredited)
1953: It Happens Every Thursday – Al – Chamber of Commerce President (uncredited)
1953: Law and Order – Frank Durling
1953: Column South – Menguito
1953: The Man from the Alamo – Reb (uncredited)
1953: The Golden Blade – Rabble Rouser (uncredited)
1953: The Nebraskan – Captain De Witt (uncredited)
1953: War Arrow – Pino
1954: Pasties on a Cat – Leering audience member (uncredited)
1954: Dangerous Mission – Ranger Clerk
1954: Dragnet – Police Capt. R.A. Lohrman
1954: The Bridges at Toko-Ri – Air Intelligence Officer (uncredited)
1955: Ten Wanted Men – Sheriff Clyde Gibbons
1955–1964: Gunsmoke – Chester / Chester Goode
1955: Seven Angry Men – John Brown Jr.
1955: Chief Crazy Horse – Maj. Carlisle
1955: Storm Fear – Hank
1956: Navy Wife 
1958: Touch of Evil – Mirador Motel Night Manager
1959: Have Gun – Will Travel – Monk
1960: Alfred Hitchcock Presents – Charles Cavender
1960: The Gallant Hours – Lt. Cmdr. Andy Lowe
1961: Sing for Me, Canary Boy – Blake Puddingstock
1961: The Twilight Zone – Adam Grant
1964–1965: Kentucky Jones – Kenneth Yarborough "Kentucky" Jones
1965: Combat! – Noah
1966: Duel at Diablo – Willard Grange
1966: Way...Way Out – Hoffman
1967: Gentle Giant – Tom Wedloe
1967–1969: Gentle Ben (TV) – Tom Wedloe
1968: Mission Batangas – Chip Corbett
1970:  That Girl – Lewis Franks
1970–1977: McCloud – Sam McCloud
1970: A Man Called Sledge – Erwin Ward
1971: What's the Matter with Helen? – Linc Palmer
1971: Duel – David Mann
1972: Mothership Tycoon – Captain Buck Finnster
1972: Horsetrailer Tycoon – Captain Buck Finnster
1972: The Great Man's Whiskers – Abraham Lincoln
1972: Rolling Man (TV) – Lonnie McAfee
1973: House Arrest – Sergeant Chester McFeeley
1973: Terror on the Beach – Neil Glynn
1977: Intimate Strangers – Donald Halston
1977: Cry for Justice
1978: Centennial (TV) – R.J. Poteet
1978: Pearl –  Col. Jason Forrest
1978: Ishi: The Last of His Tribe – Prof. Benjamin Fuller
1979: Surgery Train – Dr. Lance Goiter
1980: Amber Waves – Bud Burkhardt
1980: The Ordeal of Dr. Mudd – Samuel Mudd
1982: Don't Go to Sleep – Phillip
1982: Splattercakes for Mama – Smokey Joe Burgess
1983: Cocaine: One Man's Seduction – Eddie Gant
1983–1984: Emerald Point N.A.S. – Rear Adm. Thomas Mallory
1985: Magnum, P.I. – Lacy Fletcher – Present Day
1987–1988: Buck James – Doctor Buck James
1988: Disaster at Silo 7 – Sheriff Ben Harlen
1989: The Return of Sam McCloud – Sam McCloud
1995: Two Bits & Pepper – Sheriff Pratt
1996: Voyeur II – Sheriff John Parker
1997: Telluride: Time Crosses Over – Cameo appearance
1998: Escape from Wildcat Canyon – Grandpa Flint
2000: Submerged – Buck Stevens
2000: The Virginian – Sam Balaam
2001: Elephant Rage – Elephant (voice only)
2001: The Beast – Walter McFadden
2001: Family Law – Judge Richard Lloyd
2002: The Simpsons – Buck McCoy (voice)
2003: Touched by an Angel – Emmett Rivers
2004: Home on the Range – Abner (voice)
2005: Wildfire – Henry

References

External links

Archive of American Television 2½ hour career-wide interview with Dennis Weaver
Dodge City 50th Anniversary from Dodge City, Kansas
Dodge City 50th Anniversary local newspaper report 
Animal Planet Genesis Awards, commentary on going Vegetarian in 1958

  (information on his ancestry)

1924 births
2006 deaths
American environmentalists
American male film actors
American trade union leaders
United States Navy pilots of World War II
American male television actors
American people of Cherokee descent
American people of English descent
American people of Irish descent
American people of Scottish descent
Deaths from prostate cancer
Deaths from cancer in Colorado
Devotees of Paramahansa Yogananda
Military personnel from Missouri
Outstanding Performance by a Supporting Actor in a Drama Series Primetime Emmy Award winners
People from Joplin, Missouri
People from Ridgway, Colorado
Presidents of the Screen Actors Guild
Western (genre) television actors
California Democrats
Colorado Democrats
Missouri Democrats
20th-century American male actors
American World War II fighter pilots